"What's a Memory Like You (Doing in a Love Like This)" is a song written by Charles Quillen and John Jarrard, and recorded by actor and American country music artist John Schneider.  It was released in December 1985 as the first single from the album A Memory Like You.  The song was Schneider's third number one on the country chart.  The single went to number one for one week and spent a total of fourteen weeks on the country chart.

It was originally recorded by Conway Twitty on his 1985 album Chasin' Rainbows.

Chart performance

References

1985 singles
John Schneider (screen actor) songs
Song recordings produced by Jimmy Bowen
MCA Records singles
Songs written by John Jarrard
Songs written by Charles Quillen
Conway Twitty songs
1985 songs